Cheshmeh Pahn-e Dasht Rum (also Romanized as Cheshmeh Pahn-e Dasht Rūm; also known as Cheshmeh Pahn-e Jahānābād) is a village in Dasht-e Rum Rural District, in the Central District of Boyer-Ahmad County, Kohgiluyeh and Boyer-Ahmad Province, Iran. At the 2006 census, its population was 152, in 32 families.

References 

Populated places in Boyer-Ahmad County